Static is an unincorporated community in Clinton County, Kentucky, and Pickett County, Tennessee, in the southeastern United States. It is located on the Tennessee–Kentucky state line south of Albany, Kentucky, northwest of Jamestown, Tennessee and north of Byrdstown, Tennessee.

According to tradition, Static has the name of a settler's dog. Static has been noted for its unusual place name.

Geography
Static is located at a crossroads intersection involving U.S. Route 127 (US 127), Tennessee State Route 111 (SR 111; formerly Tennessee State Route 42), and Kentucky Route 1076 (KY 1076). Its coordinates are 36°37′19″N latitude, and 85°5′6″W longitude. Byrdstown, Tennessee, however, lies the same distance southwest via SR 111.

The town is located due east of the Dale Hollow Lake area.

Education
In terms of public schools, the Kentucky side of the Static area attends Clinton County Schools based in Albany, while students on the Tennessee side attend the small Pickett County Public Schools system.

See also

References

External links

Unincorporated communities in Clinton County, Kentucky
Unincorporated communities in Kentucky
Unincorporated communities in Pickett County, Tennessee
Unincorporated communities in Tennessee
Divided cities